Elophila obliteralis, the waterlily leafcutter moth, is a moth of the family Crambidae. It was described by Francis Walker in 1859. It is native to eastern North America. It is an introduced species in Hawaii and South Africa.

The wingspan is 10–22 mm with the male being smaller than the female. Adults are on wing from May to August in North America.

The larvae feed on a wide range of aquatic plants, including Hydrilla verticillata, Eichhornia crassipes, Pistia stratiotes, Nymphaea and Potamogeton species. At birth, larvae have a longitudinal tracheal system and some long simple hairs but do not later acquire filamentous gills. It forms a case of leaf debris. The larvae are about 9 mm long and have a pale brown head and a dull pallid-green body.

References

External links

Images

Moths described in 1859
Acentropinae
Moths of North America
Aquatic insects